The Momance River is a river of Haiti.

See also
 List of rivers of Haiti

References
 GEOnet Names Server

Rivers of Haiti